The Naghavi or Naqvi are people with the last name "Naqvi" and who are direct descendants of the Islamic prophet Muhammad through the lineage of the Imam Ali al-Naqi. 

Naghavi may also refer to:
Fatemeh Naghavi, an Iranian actress
Hossein Naghavi-Hosseini, an Iranian politician
Steve Naghavi, co-founder of German band And One